Hanford was a small agricultural community in Benton County, Washington, United States. It and White Bluffs were depopulated in 1943 in order to make room for the nuclear production facility known as the Hanford Site. The town was located in what is now the "100F" sector of the site.

The original town, named for the judge and irrigation company president Cornelius H. Hanford, was settled in 1907 on land bought by the local power and water utility. In 1913, the town had a spur railroad link to the transcontinental Chicago, Milwaukee and St. Paul Railway, also known as "the electric railroad". By 1925 the booming town enjoyed high agricultural demand and provided a hotel, bank, and elementary and high schools.

The federal government condemned Hanford to make way for the Hanford Site.  Residents were given a thirty-day eviction notice on March 9, 1943.  Most buildings were razed, with the exception of the former Hanford High School. It was used during World War II as the construction management office.

Hanford High School, albeit marred from SWAT practice, still stands today and can be seen from the Hanford tour bus operated by the U.S. government. Hanford is now protected as part of the Manhattan Project National Historical Park.

References

External links
 Hanford, WA town site at East Benton County Historical Society
 Hanford Site Environmental Report, 1997

Geography of Benton County, Washington
Ghost towns in Washington (state)
Forcibly depopulated communities in the United States
Unincorporated communities in Benton County, Washington
Unincorporated communities in Washington (state)
Populated places established in 1907
Populated places disestablished in 1943
1907 establishments in Washington (state)
1943 disestablishments in the United States